The following is a list of ongoing armed conflicts that are taking place around the world.

Parameters
This list of ongoing armed conflicts identifies present-day conflicts and the death toll associated with each conflict. The guidelines of inclusion are the following:
 Armed conflicts consist in the use of armed force between two or more organized armed groups, governmental or non-governmental. Interstate, intrastate and non-state armed conflicts are listed.
 This is not a list of countries by intentional homicide rate, and criminal gang violence is generally not included unless there is also significant military or paramilitary involvement.
 Fatality figures include battle-related deaths (military and civilian) as well as civilians intentionally targeted by the parties to an armed conflict. Only direct deaths resulting from violence are included for the current and past year; excess deaths indirectly resulting from famine, disease, or disruption of services are included along with violent deaths in the cumulative fatalities count when available.
 Listed conflicts have at least 100 cumulative deaths in total and at least 1 death in current or in the past calendar year.
 Fatality totals may be inaccurate or unavailable due to a lack of information. A figure with a plus symbol, indicates that at least that many people have died (e.g. 455+ indicates that at least 455 people have died).
 Location refers to the states where the main violence takes place, not to the warring parties. Italics indicate disputed territories and unrecognized states.
 A territorial dispute or a protest movement which has not experienced deliberate and systematic deaths due to state or paramilitary violence is not considered to be an armed conflict.

Major wars (10,000 or more combat-related deaths in current or past year)
The three conflicts in the following list have caused at least 10,000 direct, violent deaths per year in battles between identified groups, in a current or past calendar year.

Wars (1,000–9,999 combat-related deaths in current or past year)
The  conflicts in the following list have caused at least 1,000 and fewer than 10,000 direct, violent deaths in a current or past calendar year. Conflicts causing at least 1,000 deaths in one calendar year are considered wars by the Uppsala Conflict Data Program.

Minor conflicts (100–999 combat-related deaths in current or past year)
The  conflicts in the following list have caused at least 100, and fewer than 1,000, direct, violent deaths in a current or past calendar year.

Skirmishes and clashes (fewer than 100 combat-related deaths in current or past year)
The  conflicts in the following list have caused fewer than 100 direct, violent deaths in a current or past calendar year.

Deaths by country

*Mainly homicides rather than battle-related casualties

See also 

Outline of war (by date, region, type of conflict, deaths)
 List of number of conflicts per year
 List of wars: 2003–present
 List of events named massacres
 List of terrorist incidents
Lists of active separatist movements
 List of active rebel groups
 List of rebel groups that control territory
 List of designated terrorist groups
List of wars extended by diplomatic irregularity
Frozen conflict
 Uppsala Conflict Data Program
Casualty recording
 Failed state

Notes

References

External links 

 Major Episodes of Political Violence 1946–2019 – List of armed conflicts compiled by Dr. Monty G. Marshall, director of the Center for Systemic Peace, based on research sponsored by the Political Instability Task Force.
 UCDP Conflict Encyclopedia – Uppsala Conflict Data Program of the Department of Peace and Conflict Research at Uppsala University.
 Armed Conflicts Report Interactive Map, by Project Ploughshares.
 Global Conflict Tracker , by the Council on Foreign Relations.
 CrisisWatch – Monthly bulletin, interactive map and database on ongoing conflicts by the International Crisis Group.
 Map of the world's conflicts, by IRIN.
 History Guy's coverage of 21st century wars
 Heidelberg Institute for International Conflict Research (HIIK)
 Conflict Barometer – Describes recent trends in conflict development, escalations, and settlements
 Insight on Conflict – Database on peace-building initiatives in areas of conflict
 Mapped: Where are the World's Ongoing Conflicts Today? an infographic map on ongoing conflicts

Ongoing
Ongoing

 
z

History-related lists
20th-century military history